Peckoltia vermiculata is a species of catfish in the family Loricariidae. It is a freshwater fish native to South America, where it occurs in the middle and lower sections of the Amazon River basin in Brazil. The species reaches 13 cm (5.1 inches) SL.

References 

Loricariidae
Catfish of South America
Fish described in 1908